Paul v Germany [2004] ECR I-09425 is a European Court of Justice case regarding the civil liability of bank regulators in a case where those regulators were alleged to have failed in their duty. As of November 2008, it is the only ECJ case to consider the Deposit Guarantee Directive (94/19/EC), which was one of the causes of the Icesave dispute between Iceland and the United Kingdom in late 2008.

Facts

Judgment
The Court ruled that the various Directives on banking supervision did not confer rights on individuals, and so individual depositors were not entitled to damages from banking supervisors if those Directives were breached. The only individual right guaranteed under European Union law was the minimum deposit insurance, covering the first 20 000 euros.

See also
EU law

References

Court of Justice of the European Union case law
German case law
2004 in case law
2004 in Germany